De Club van Sinterklaas (English literal title: The Club of Sinterklaas, international title: St. Nicholas & Friends) was a Dutch seasonal children's telenovella between 1999 and 2009 based on the legend of Sinterklaas and Zwarte Piet. Since 2010, De club van Sinterklaas continues as a YouTube channel and a film series. 

The series attracted mass popularity in the Netherlands during its television running time. Several of the series theme songs charted in the Dutch Single Top 100 and its 2005 and 2006 theme songs even topped the charts. It became the only Sinterklaas-related children's programme to be ever nominated for a Gouden Stuiver, where it lost out to Het Huis Anubis. 

In the wake of the zwartepietendiscussie, the original series was disregarded by its right holders RTL Nederland due to the use of black face paint on white actors and the traditional depiction of Zwarte Piet.

Premise
The series follows a group of Zwarte Pieten on their misadventures on their yearly journey to the Netherlands. The series has a different subtitle every year in relation to the plot of the year.

Controversy
The practice of face painting white actors with black face paint was well-accepted in Dutch society until the late 2000s. However, in the early 2010s, in the wake of the zwartepietendiscussie, De club van Sinterklaas became one of the first Dutch television series to stop this practice and introduced the 'soot' version of the character in 2017. As the debate continued, RTL decided to remove the older series from its streaming platform Videoland as well as removing all the content prior to 2017 from De club van Sinterklaas YouTube channel. Earlier on, VEVO had removed all the music videos from the SinterklaasVEVO channel.

Cast

Main

Sinterklaas - Bram van der Vlugt (1999-2009)
Wegwijspiet - Michiel Kerbosch (1999-2005)
Chefpiet - Don van Dijke (1999-2002, 2005)
Muziekpiet - Win Schluter (1999-present)
Hooge Hoogtepiet- Tim de Zwart (2001, 2003-2020)
Testpiet - Beryl van Praag (2001-present)
Coole Piet - Harold Verwoert (2001-2007, 2009-2011)
Profpiet- Piet van der Pas (2003-present)
Hulppiet- Titus Boonstra (2004-2011)

Supporting
Meneer de Directeur - Tim de Zwart (2002-2004)
Jacob - Peter de Gelder (2003-2005)
Tante Toets - Maja van den Broecke (2005)

Television series 
 Season 1 (1999): De club van Sinterklaas
 Season 2 (2001): De nieuwe club of Sinterklaas
 Season 3 (2002): De club van Sinterklaas & De verdwijning van Wagen 27  
 Season 4 (2003): De club van Sinterklaas & Het blafpoeder
 Season 5 (2004): De club van Sinterklaas & De brieven van Jacob 
 Season 6 (2005): De club van Sinterklaas & De streken van Tante Toets 
 Season 7 (2006): De club van Sinterklaas & Paniek in de confettifabriek
 Season 8 (2007): De club van Sinterklaas & De speelgoeddief
 Season 9 (2008): De club van Sinterklaas & De grote onbekende
 Season 10 (2009): De club van Sinterklaas & De jacht op het kasteel

External links 
 Jetix' official De Club website

References 

1999 Dutch television series debuts
Dutch children's television series
Dutch-language television shows
Dutch movie series
Sinterklaas